Ruhrgas AG (original name: Aktiengesellschaft für Kohleverwertung; later: E.ON Ruhrgas) was the largest natural gas transportation and trading company based in Essen, Germany. The company was founded in 1926 and it finally ceased to exist on 2 May 2013 when it was merged into E.ON Global Commodities SE (now: Uniper Global Commodities SE).

History
Ruhrgas AG was founded in 1926 as a natural gas transportation company by Vereinigte Stahlwerke AG and Zeche Mathias Stinnes as Aktiengesellschaft für Kohleverwertung. The newly founded company took over the distribution of the coal gas produced in the coking plants Vereinigte Stahlwerke AG and Zeche Mathias Stinne. In 1928, Aktiengesellschaft für Kohleverwertung acquired  pipeline network from RWE AG. Consequently, the company was renamed Ruhrgas AG. By the end of the decade, gas supply contracts were signed with Cologne, Düsseldorf, Hanover, and Saarbrücken. By 1936, its pipeline network accounted  and the company delivered  of coal gas from 32 coking plants. Among other industries, it delivered gas to Adam Opel works.

In 1938, natural gas was found near Bad Bentheim. In 1939, at the request of the Reich Ministry of Economics requested Ruhrgas to integrate the gas deposit into the existing pipeline network. However, due to the World War II, it was not until 1944 that a  pipeline from ad Bentheim to the chemical works in Hüls was completed.  During the World War II a lot of the gas infrastructure was destruction. However, by the end of 1945, the pipeline network was 90% restored.

In the 1940s, Ruhrgas in cooperation with Lurgi Gesellschaft für Wärmetechnik G.m.b.H. developed the Lurgi–Ruhrgas process, a process for a low-temperature liquefaction of lignite (brown coal) and oil shale.

In 1948, Ruhrgas together with Thyssengas jstarted coal gas export to the Netherlands.

In 1970, Ruhrgas signed the first contract to import natural gas from the Soviet Union, becoming the largest natural gas import and distribution company in Germany. In 1971, Ruhrgas started supplying natural gas to Switzerland through the Trans Europa Naturgas Pipeline in cooperation with Snam and Swissgas. In 1973, it signed a contract to buy natural gas from the North Sea Ekofisk field through the Norpipe pipeline. Deliveries from Norway started in 1977. In 1973, Ruhrgas started to buy Soviet gas through East Germany to supply West Berlin. In 1975, Ruhrgas and Gaz de France formed a partnership Mittel-Europäische-Gasleitungsgesellschaft to build the MEGAL pipeline for transportation of Russian natural gas to France and southern Germany. The pipeline was commissioned in 1980. In 1982, it signed a contract with Soyuzgasexport supporting construction of the Urengoy–Pomary–Uzhgorod pipeline. At the same year, Ruhrgas joined the consortium to import natural gas from Statfjord field. Deliveries started after commissioning the Statpipe pipeline in 1985.

It sold  of natural gas.

In 1999, the company donated US$3.5 million for restoration of the Amber Room.

Ruhrgas was acquired by energy company E.ON in March 2003. On 1 July 2004, the company was renamed accordingly E.ON Ruhrgas. That time, it became the largest foreign shareholder in the Russian gas company Gazprom by 6.5% of shares. These shares were bought back by Gazprom in October 2009 as a result of the asset-swap deal between E.On and Gazprom.  As a result of thedeal, E.ON Ruhrgas acquired a 25% stake, minus three ordinary registered shares plus three preference non-voting shares in Severneftegazprom, an operator of the Yuzhno-Russkoye field.

In June 2005, E.ON Ruhrgas acquired 51% of the Romanian gas utility DistriGaz Nord and renamed it E.ON Gaz România. On 8 September 2005, E.ON Ruhrgas signed an agreement to participate in the Nord Stream 1 project. The pipeline became operational in 2011.

By 2008, E.ON Ruhrgas owned  of pipelines.

In July 2010, E.ON Ruhrgas acquired 15% of the shares in the Trans Adriatic Pipeline project.

On 1 September 2010, based on the European Union Third Energy Package, the gas transportation and gas storage operations of E.ON Ruhrgas were transferred to E.ON Gastransport and renamed Open Grid Europe. On 2 May 2013, E.ON Ruhrgas was merged with E.ON Global Commodities SE, now part of Uniper.

The name Ruhrgas is still used by Uniper Ruhrgas International GmbH, a subsidiary of Uniper. It was founded as E.ON Ruhrgas International GmbH in 1994, after takeover of Ruhrgas by E.ON on the basis of Ruhrgas international activities.

Shareholders
Before acquisition by E.ON, shareholders of Ruhrgas were:
 Bergemann GmbH (59.76%) – a holding company owned by Gelsenberg AG (Deutsche BP Holding AG), RAG BeteiligungsGmbH (RAG AG), Mannesmann AG, ThyssenKrupp AG, RWE DEA AG, VEBA AG;
 25% Brigitta Erdgas und Erdöl GmbH – a joint venture owned by Esso AG and Deutsche Shell AG;
 15% Schubert KG u. a. – a holding company owned by Schubert Beteiligungs GmbH (a joint venture of Mobil Oil AG and Preussag AG), Elwerath Erdgas und Erdöl GmbH (a joint venture of ESSO AG and Deutsche Shell AG), Gelsenberg AG (Deutsche BP Holding AG);
 0.24% minority shareholders.

References

Bibliography

External links
 

Natural gas companies of Germany
Defunct companies of Germany
E.ON
German companies established in 1926
German companies disestablished in 2013
Energy companies established in 1926